Indian Cricket may refer to one of the following:
Cricket in India
Indian cricket team
Indian Cricket (annual)
Board of Control for Cricket in India, the board which governs cricketing in India.